Yellapura is a town in the Uttara Kannada district of Karnataka, India.It is a major trading centre for Arecanut, which is the primary crop grown in the villages surrounding the town. Approximately 90% of the population of Yellapura are farmers who grow Arecanut and paddy.

Geography

Yellapur is located in the Western Ghats region of Karnataka. It has an average elevation of 541 metres (1774 feet). Among many other hills and valleys, there are two well-known natural falls near Yellapur: Satoddi Falls, 25 km away from the town, and Magod Falls, 19 km away from Yellapur, in the village of Magodu. 17 km from Yellapur is Jenukallu Gudda (Honey-Stone Hill), a viewpoint with a panoramic view of the Western Ghats.

Demographics
According to the 2001 Indian census, Yellapur had a population of 17,938, 51% male and 49% female. Yellapur has an average literacy rate of 73%, higher than the national average of 59.5%: male literacy is 79%, and female literacy is 68%. 12% of the population of Yellapur is under six years of age. Kannada is the dominant language and Konkani is also spoken by significant population of the region. Members of an African tribe have lived in the town for several centuries.

Media
Karavali Munjavu is one of the major local newspapers in the region. The town of Yellapur has been featured on the MTV Sound Trippin show, hosted by Sneha Khanwalkar.

Transport
Regular buses run between Yellapur and many other locations in Karnataka. The town does not have its own rail station, but the nearest major station is Alnavar Junction, roughly 60 km away. The nearest airport is Hubli Airport, 80 km away. Yellapura lies on national highway-52( old NH-63) which connects to Hubballi city and Ankola town. Also there are Karnataka state highway roads which connect Yellapura to Mundgod(SH-6) and Haliyal(SH-93) towns.

See also
Sirsi, Karnataka
Sirsi Marikamba Temple
Yana, India
National Highway 52 (India)

References

Cities and towns in Uttara Kannada district
Populated places in the Western Ghats
Tourism in Karnataka
Hill stations in Karnataka